Ceres Unified School District is a school district based in Stanislaus County, California, United States of America. It is headquartered in Ceres, California. The district consists of 21 elementary, junior high, and high schools.

References

External links

School districts in Stanislaus County, California